Kali Ganga is a Bollywood action film released in 1990 and stars Dimple Kapadia in the title role of an dacoit, along with Govinda, Anuradha Patel, Suresh Oberoi in pivotal roles.

Plot
Ganga lives with her mother and two brothers Chote and Govinda. Her one brother Chote gets severely tortured by goons. A ruthless Thakur Hukumchand and his gang terrorise the village. They kill Chote and rape Ganga and destroy the whole family. Ganga become dacoit to take revenge.

Cast
 Dimple Kapadia as Ganga
 Govinda as Govinda
 Prem Chopra as Thakur Hukumchand
 Anuradha Patel as Anu
 Suresh Oberoi as Inspector Shiva
 Sudhir as Shera
 Chirag Patel as Chote
 Tej Sapru as Jaggu

Soundtrack
"Chhuo Na Chhuo Na Yu Mujhe Chhuo Na" - Alisha Chinai, Shailendra Singh
"Mere Dil Ne Sapna Jo Dekha Tha" - Mohammed Aziz
"Hawa Ye Hawa" - Uttara Kelkar
"O Maa Devi Maa" - S Janaki

References

External links
 

1990 films
Films scored by Bappi Lahiri
1990s Hindi-language films
Films directed by Raj N. Sippy
Indian rape and revenge films
Indian action films